Storena is a genus of ant spiders first described by Charles Athanase Walckenaer in 1805.

Species
 it contains 55 species:

S. analis Simon, 1893 — Ecuador
S. annulipes (L. Koch, 1867) — Australia (Queensland)
S. aspinosa Jocqué & Baehr, 1992 — Australia (South Australia)
S. botenella Jocqué & Baehr, 1992 — Australia (South Australia)
S. braccata (L. Koch, 1865) — Australia (New South Wales)
S. canalensis Berland, 1924 — New Caledonia
S. caporiaccoi Brignoli, 1983 — Venezuela
S. charlotte Jocqué & Baehr, 1992 — Australia (Queensland, Victoria)
S. cochleare Jocqué & Baehr, 1992 — Australia (New South Wales)
S. colossea Rainbow, 1920 — Australia (Lord Howe Is.)
S. cyanea Walckenaer, 1805 — Eastern Australia
S. daviesae Jocqué & Baehr, 1992 — Australia (Queensland)
S. deserticola Jocqué, 1991 — Australia (Northern Territory)
S. digitulus Jocqué & Baehr, 1992 — Australia (Queensland)
S. eximia Simon, 1908 — Australia (Western Australia)
S. flavipes (Urquhart, 1893) — Australia (Tasmania)
S. flavopicta (Simon, 1876) — Indonesia (Moluccas)
S. flexuosa (Thorell, 1895) — Myanmar
S. formosa Thorell, 1870 — Australia (mainland, Lord Howe Is.)
S. fungina Jocqué & Baehr, 1992 — Australia (Western Australia)
S. graeffei (L. Koch, 1866) — Australia (New South Wales)
S. harveyi Jocqué & Baehr, 1995 — Australia (Western Australia)
S. ignava Jocqué & Baehr, 1992 — Australia (Northern Territory)
S. inornata Rainbow, 1916 — Australia (Queensland)
S. kraepelini Simon, 1905 — Indonesia (Java)
S. lebruni Simon, 1886 — Argentina
S. lesserti Berland, 1938 — Vanuatu
S. longiducta Jocqué & Baehr, 1992 — Australia (Queensland)
S. maculata O. Pickard-Cambridge, 1869 — Australia (Queensland)
S. mainae Jocqué & Baehr, 1995 — Australia (New South Wales, Victoria)
S. martini Jocqué & Baehr, 1992 — Australia (Northern Territory)
S. mathematica Jocqué & Baehr, 1992 — Australia (Northern Territory)
S. metallica Jocqué & Baehr, 1992 — Australia (Queensland)
S. nana Jocqué & Baehr, 1992 — Australia (Victoria)
S. nuga Jocqué & Baehr, 1992 — Australia (Queensland)
S. ornata (Bradley, 1877) — Australia (Queensland)
S. parvicavum Jocqué & Baehr, 1992 — Australia (Queensland)
S. parvula Berland, 1938 — Vanuatu
S. paucipunctata Jocqué & Baehr, 1992 — Australia (Western Australia)
S. procedens Jocqué & Baehr, 1992 — Australia (Queensland)
S. rainbowi Berland, 1924 — New Caledonia
S. rastellata Strand, 1913 — Central Australia
S. raveni Jocqué & Baehr, 1992 — Australia (Queensland)
S. recta Jocqué & Baehr, 1992 — Australia (Western Australia, Queensland, New South Wales)
S. recurvata Jocqué & Baehr, 1992 — Australia (Queensland, New South Wales, Victoria)
S. rotunda Jocqué & Baehr, 1992 — Australia (New South Wales)
S. rufescens Thorell, 1881 — New Guinea, Australia (Queensland)
S. rugosa Simon, 1889 — New Caledonia
S. scita Jocqué & Baehr, 1992 — Australia (Queensland)
S. silvicola Berland, 1924 — New Caledonia
S. sinuosa Jocqué & Baehr, 1992 — Australia (Western Australia)
S. tenera (Thorell, 1895) — Myanmar
S. tricolor Simon, 1908 — Australia (Western Australia)
S. variegata O. Pickard-Cambridge, 1869 — Australia (Western Australia, South Australia)
S. zavattarii Caporiacco, 1941 — Ethiopia

References

Araneomorphae genera
Zodariidae